Mibora minima, the early sandgrass, is a small (between 2 and 15 cm high) annual species of grass that is native in western and southwestern Europe.

It is an invasive species on both sides of the Canada–United States border from Lake Huron east to Maine.

It grows on moist sand in open vegetations.

Description 
Mibora minima is a small annual species of grass, with tufts of thin stems of about 0.3 mm wide and 10 cm long, each with 2 or 3 leaves at or very near the base, consisting of tender, shallowly grooved sheaths, rounded at their back, 0.2–1 mm long ligules, flat or enrolled blades of 1–5 cm long which are up to 0.5 mm wide and have a stump tip.

References 

Pooideae
Grasses of Europe
Flora of Southwestern Europe
Plants described in 1753
Taxa named by Carl Linnaeus